Spring Creek Township may refer to:

Arkansas

Spring Creek Township, Lee County, Arkansas
Spring Creek Township, Phillips County, Arkansas

Illinois

Spring Creek Township, Pike County, Illinois

Iowa

Spring Creek Township, Black Hawk County, Iowa
Spring Creek Township, Mahaska County, Iowa
Spring Creek Township, Tama County, Iowa

Kansas

Spring Creek Township, Coffey County, Kansas
Spring Creek Township, Cowley County, Kansas
Spring Creek Township, Greenwood County, Kansas
Spring Creek Township, Pottawatomie County, Kansas, in Pottawatomie County, Kansas
Spring Creek Township, Saline County, Kansas, in Saline County, Kansas

Minnesota

Spring Creek Township, Becker County, Minnesota
Spring Creek Township, Norman County, Minnesota

Missouri

Spring Creek Township, Ozark County, Missouri
Spring Creek Township, Howell County, Missouri
Spring Creek Township, Phelps County, Missouri
Spring Creek Township, Shannon County, Missouri
Spring Creek Township, Douglas County, Missouri
Spring Creek Township, Maries County, Missouri

Nebraska

Spring Creek Township, Custer County, Nebraska

North Dakota

Spring Creek Township, Barnes County, North Dakota

Ohio

Springcreek Township, Miami County, Ohio

Oklahoma

Spring Creek Township, Logan County, Oklahoma
Spring Creek Township, Oklahoma County, Oklahoma

Pennsylvania

Spring Creek Township, Elk County, Pennsylvania
Spring Creek Township, Warren County, Pennsylvania

South Dakota

Spring Creek Township, Moody County, South Dakota

See also

Spring Creek (disambiguation)
Spring Creek East Township, Dent County, Missouri
Spring Creek West Township, Dent County, Missouri

Township name disambiguation pages